Sun-Ah Jun  (born November 6, 1959) is a Korean-American professor of linguistics at the University of California, Los Angeles.

Education 
Jun received her Ph.D. in Linguistics from Ohio State University in 1993, with a dissertation entitled, The Phonetics and Phonology of Korean Prosody.

Career 
As a professor at UCLA's Department of Linguistics, Jun is known for her research in the areas of Phonetics, Laboratory Phonology, Intonational Phonology, Prosody, and Language Acquisition. She is the editor of Prosodic Typology: The Phonology of Intonation and Phrasing as well as of Prosodic Typology II: The Phonology of Intonation and Phrasing.

References 

1959 births
Living people
Ohio State University alumni
University of California, Los Angeles faculty
Linguists from the United States
Women linguists